Karan Aujla is an Indo-Canadian singer, rapper, and songwriter in the Punjabi music industry. He has released over fifty-two singles as a lead artist and thirty-four as a lyricist. He has also featured on fifty-four songs as a guest artist. Eleven of his singles as a lead artist have been featured on the global YouTube music chart, while nineteen have been featured on the UK Asian music chart by the OCC.

Studio albums

Extended plays

Singles

As lead artist

As featured artist 

Aujla also credited as songwriter for lead artist, except where mentioned

Film soundtracks

Songwriting discography

Music videos

References 

 
Hip hop discographies 
Discographies of Canadian artists 
Contemporary R&B discographies
Pop music discographies
Rhythm and blues discographies
Discographies of Indian artists